Septimus Edward Norris (March 10, 1911 – December 18, 2002) was an American film actor.

Early years
Norris was born in 1911, the son of a prominent Philadelphia gynecologist, who was described in a newspaper article as "a famous surgeon and chief of staff at the city's largest hospital." He grew up in Philadelphia, Pennsylvania. At age 16, he dropped out of the Culver Military Academy to marry a socially prominent physician's daughter, Virginia Bell Hiller, and took a job as a reporter.

Television
Norris made his television debut in 1951 with two appearances on Fireside Theater. 

During the course of his 12-year span on television he made two guest appearances on Perry Mason: "The Case of the Fiery Fingers" (1958) and "The Case of the Tarnished Trademark" (1962). He ended his film and television career the following year when he appeared on an episode of The Third Man, titled "Ghost Town".

Military service
Norris was a flying instructor in the United States Army Air Forces during World War II.

Personal life
After Hiller, Norris was married to actresses Ann Sheridan and Lona Andre. On July 21, 1942, newspaper columnist Harrison Carroll reported that Norris "eloped to Arizona Saturday with a new Hollywood beauty who gave her name as Jane Doe." Another newspaper report said, "An affidavit on file testified that the girl's correct name was Jane Doe." The bride's real name was revealed by columnist Jimmie Fidler on July 30, 1942: "The girl Edward Norris married and introduced to reporters as 'Jane Doe' is June Satterlee, ex-night club hatcheck looker. She's to make a picture to be titled Meet Jane Doe." In March 1943, Norris was granted a divorce from Satterlee "after testifying that she married him solely to further her career in pictures."

Norris was an avid shooter and "won many ribbons and trophies in skeet matches throughout the country." He was also a licensed pilot.

Death
Norris died on December 18, 2002, at Fort Bragg, California.

Filmography

References

External links

 

1911 births
2002 deaths
American male film actors
American male television actors
20th-century American male actors
Male actors from Philadelphia
People from Fort Bragg, California
Culver Academies alumni